David Levene may refer to:
 David Levene (footballer) (1908–1970), English footballer
 David Levene (businessman) (1929–2021), New Zealand businessman and philanthropist

See also
 David Levine (disambiguation)